Kimiko Douglass-Ishizaka (born 4 December 1976) is a German Japanese composer, pianist, and former Olympic weightlifter and powerlifter.

Music 

Born in Bonn, Germany, Douglass-Ishizaka (known as Ishizaka) started playing the piano at age four, was a member of the Ishizaka Trio for 16 years with her brothers and graduated from Hochschule für Musik Köln. As a solo pianist, she has performed concerts throughout Europe, North America and Japan, as well as appearing with the Beethoven Orchester Bonn, the Klassische Philharmonie Bonn and the Jackson Symphony Orchestra (Michigan).

In 1998 Ishizaka won the Deutscher Musikwettbewerb (German Music Competition), along with her brothers Kiyondo Ishizaka and Danjulo Ishizaka.

Ishizaka is part of the Open Goldberg Variations, a Kickstarter-funded, and Bösendorfer-sponsored team that recorded Johann Sebastian Bach's Goldberg Variations and released the score and recordings into the public domain in May 2012.

Ishizaka made her debut as a composer on March 19, 2016, with her performance of Bach's The Art of the Fugue featuring her own completion of the final fugue. In 2017, she then recorded a version, including her completion, and released it under a Creative Commons license, available for download in audiophile quality from her website.

On October 1, 2019, Ishizaka released her album New Me! on her website on the platform Bandcamp.

Weightlifting

Ishizaka explained in an interview that she began weightlifting after a convicted bank robber encouraged her to work out with free weights instead of relying on exercise machines and similar devices:
"He had learned in prison that real physical power comes from whole-body exercises such as the squat and deadlift. When I showed alacrity and some talent for the pursuit, he introduced me to a retired Persian weightlifting champion who managed to instill a sense of the purity and respect for the sport. I eventually moved to Cologne from Bonn to be near the weightlifting club, carefully choosing an apartment within walking distance so that I could train four days a week."

Her weight training led to a change in her pianistic technique:
"In my early 20s, I had very thin arms—I couldn't get a beautiful sound out of the piano and I got very tired playing, say, two Chopin études in a row. As I got stronger, I found a way of using my shoulders, arms, and back to produce the sound. These days I only use my fingers for support."

She trains with 265lb of weights after practicing piano to maintain her piano performance level.

Powerlifting 

Ishizaka placed 3rd in the weight category < 82 kg in the 2005 German championships in powerlifting and in 2006 placed 2nd in the disciplines of bench press, squat and deadlift.

Olympic weightlifting 
Ishizaka won three medals at the 2008 German championships in Olympic weightlifting.

In the spring of 2008 she placed 5th in the ELEIKO Women's Grand Prix in Niederöblarn, Austria, in the 63 kg class.

References

External links 

Official web page
Open Goldberg Variations
Open Well-Tempered Clavier

1976 births
Living people
German classical pianists
Women classical pianists
German female weightlifters
German people of Japanese descent
Sportspeople from Bonn
21st-century classical pianists